Tanah Rata is a town located in Cameron Highlands, Pahang, Malaysia. The name "tanah rata" means flat ground in Malay and it refers to the relatively flat area on which the town is located amidst this highland region.

It is the largest town in the Cameron Highlands region and contains many facilities and amenities, including the district council, banks and ATMs, the main Police Station of Cameron Highlands and the main hospital in Cameron Highlands. Having a taxi station and a bus station makes it easy to travel to other parts of Cameron Highlands, as well as to Ipoh and to Kuala Lumpur. It also has a good selection of backpacker inns and good-class hotels at various prices.

Climate 

References

Cameron Highlands
Towns in Pahang